Foumani is a surname. Notable people with the surname include:

 Kioumars Saberi Foumani (1941–2004), Iranian satirist, writer, and teacher
 Mohammad-Taqi Bahjat Foumani (1913–2009), Iranian Shia Marja

Surnames of Iranian origin